Mendhamuge Evaguthu is a 2010 Maldivian horror film written and directed by Yoosuf Shafeeu and Amjad Ibrahim. Produced by Hussain Rasheed, the film stars Yoosuf Shafeeu, Fathimath Fareela, Ali Fizam and Amira Ismail in pivotal roles.

Plot
A group of ten friends gather at a haunted house to watch a horror film. The screened film revolves around four friends who observe a rash of red bumps on their skin once they narrate a true terror incident that had happened on Addu Link Road.

Cast

Soundtrack

References

2010 films
Maldivian horror films
2010 horror films
Films directed by Yoosuf Shafeeu
Films directed by Amjad Ibrahim